Olivia Haigh Williams (born 26 July 1968) is a British actress who has appeared in British and American films and television.

After studying drama at the Bristol Old Vic Theatre School for two years followed by three years at the Royal Shakespeare Company, her first significant screen role was as Jane Fairfax in the British television film Emma (1996), based on Jane Austen's novel. She made her film debut in 1997's The Postman, followed by Rushmore (1998) and The Sixth Sense (1999). Williams then appeared in several British films, including Lucky Break (2001), The Heart of Me (2002) and An Education (2009). In 2010, she won acclaim for her performance as Ruth Lang in Roman Polanski's The Ghost Writer. From 2017 to 2019, she played Emily Silk on the science fiction television series Counterpart. In 2022, Williams portrayed Camilla Parker Bowles in the Netflix historical drama The Crown in its fifth season, a role she is set to reprise in its sixth and final season.

Early life
Williams was born in North London. Both her parents are barristers. Williams was educated at South Hampstead High School, an independent school for girls in Hampstead in north London, followed by Newnham College, Cambridge, from which she graduated with a degree in English literature. She then studied drama at the Bristol Old Vic Theatre School for two years and spent three years at the Royal Shakespeare Company.

Career

After graduation, Williams worked with the Royal Shakespeare Company in both Stratford-upon-Avon and London. In 1995, she toured the United States in a production of Shakespeare's Richard III starring Ian McKellen. Her first significant appearance before the cameras was as Jane Fairfax in the British TV film Emma (1996), based on Jane Austen's 1816 novel.

Williams made her film debut in the 1997 movie The Postman, after doing a screen test for Kevin Costner. She later won the lead role of Rosemary Cross in Wes Anderson's Rushmore (1998). She then starred as Bruce Willis' wife in the blockbuster The Sixth Sense (1999), a film she would later parody during her brief appearance in the British sitcom Spaced. Since then, Williams has appeared in several British films, including Lucky Break (2001), The Heart of Me (2002), for which she won the British Independent Film Award for Best Actress, and An Education (2009). She played Mrs. Darling in the 2003 film adaptation of Peter Pan. Williams was uncredited for her role as Dr. Moira MacTaggert in the 2006 film X-Men: The Last Stand.

On TV, Williams portrayed British author Jane Austen in Miss Austen Regrets (2008) and was cast as Adelle DeWitt in Joss Whedon's Dollhouse, which ran on Fox from 2009 to 2010.

In 2010, she won acclaim for her performance as Ruth Lang in Roman Polanski's Ghost Writer, winning the National Society of Film Critics Award, London Critics Circle Film Award for best supporting actress and was runner-up for best supporting actress at the Los Angeles Film Critics Association Awards 2010.

In Hanna (2011), she played Rachel, a bohemian mother travelling across North Africa and Europe, who comes into contact with the eponymous teen assassin, who is on the run. The film starred Saoirse Ronan, Eric Bana and Cate Blanchett, and was a critical and sleeper hit. In 2014, Williams co-starred in David Cronenberg's Maps to the Stars, a dark comic look at Hollywood excess. In 2014 she portrayed Meg Hamilton in the British mystery film Altar.

In 2017 Williams began appearing in the Starz science-fiction series Counterpart, playing Emily, the wife of lead character Howard Silk. In one universe she is still married to him, but her counterpart in the other universe is divorced from him. In 2021, she was cast as Camilla, Duchess of Cornwall, for the final two seasons of The Crown.

In 2000, Williams wrote the short story "The Significance of Hair" for BBC Radio, and read it on the air.

Personal life
Williams had a seven-year relationship and then engagement to the actor Jonathan Cake which ended two weeks before their planned wedding. In 2003, she married the actor and playwright Rhashan Stone, with whom she has two daughters.

After filming The Postman, she spent time in Bolivia studying spectacled bears in the rainforest.

Williams was diagnosed with VIPoma in 2018 and, after treatment, became an ambassador for Pancreatic Cancer UK.

Filmography

Film

Television

Theatre

Awards and nominations
 2001: Lucky Break
 Nominated: Empire Award for Best Actress

 2002: The Heart of Me
 Won: British Independent Film Award for Best Actress

 2009: An Education
 Nominated: London Film Critics Circle Award for British Supporting Actress of the Year
 Nominated: Screen Actors Guild Award for Outstanding Performance by a Cast in a Motion Picture

 2010: The Ghost Writer
 Won: London Film Critics Circle Award for British Supporting Actress of the Year
 Won: National Society of Film Critics Award for Best Supporting Actress
 Nominated: Empire Award for Best Actress
 Nominated: Los Angeles Film Critics Association Award for Best Supporting Actress

 2023: The Crown:
 Nominated: SAG Award for Outstanding Performance by an Ensemble in a Drama Series

Notes

Further reading

External links
 
 

1968 births
20th-century English actresses
21st-century English actresses
Actresses from London
Alumni of Newnham College, Cambridge
English Shakespearean actresses
English dramatists and playwrights
English film actresses
English radio actresses
English stage actresses
English television actresses
English voice actresses
Living people
People educated at South Hampstead High School
People from Camden Town
Royal Shakespeare Company members
Alumni of Bristol Old Vic Theatre School